Ram Charitra Nishad (1 May 1964 – 3 May 2021) was a member of the Samajwadi Party and won the 2014 Indian general elections from the Machhlishahr (Lok Sabha constituency) on Bharatiya Janata Party ticket.

Early life and education
Ram Charitra Nishad was born in New Delhi on 1 May 1964. He was born to Shri Ram Narayan and Smt. Dhanpati Devi. He has completed his education from A.P.N. Degree College, Basti, Uttar Pradesh. He married Anamika Sharma on 23 April 2000. He died from COVID-19 on 3 May 2021.

Political career
May, 2014: Elected to 16th Lok Sabha
Member (Permanent Special Invitee), Consultative Committee, Ministry of Tourism and Culture
Member, Consultative Committee, Ministry of Finance and Corporate Affairs
25 March 2015 onwards: Member, Standing Committee on Transport, Tourism and Culture
1 May 2016 onwards: Member, Committee on the Welfare of Scheduled Castes and Scheduled Tribes
19 April 2019 : Left Bharatiya Janata Party because of not giving ticket again and Joined Samajwadi Party in presence of SP Chief Akhilesh Yadav.
23 May 2019: Lost election from Mirzapur (Lok Sabha constituency) on Samajwadi Party Ticket.
3 May 2021: Died From Covid19

References

External links 

1964 births
2021 deaths
India MPs 2014–2019
Bharatiya Janata Party politicians from Uttar Pradesh
Lok Sabha members from Uttar Pradesh
People from Jaunpur district
Samajwadi Party politicians from Uttar Pradesh
Deaths from the COVID-19 pandemic in India